This is a list of notable events in Latin music (music from Spanish- and Portuguese-speaking areas from Latin America, Europe, and the United States) that took place in 1992.

Events 
February 25 – The 34th Annual Grammy Awards are held at the Radio City Music Hall in New York City.
Vikki Carr wins the Grammy Award for Best Latin Pop Album for her album Cosas del Amor.
Juan Luis Guerra wins the Grammy Award for Best Tropical Latin Album for his album Bachata Rosa
Little Joe wins the Grammy Award for Best Mexican-American Album for his album 16 de Septiembre.
 May 14 – The 4th Annual Lo Nuestro Awards are held at the James L. Knight Center in Miami, Florida. Mexican singer Ana Gabriel is the most awarded artist with four wins.

Bands formed 
Cristian Castro (Latin pop singer)
Paulina Rubio (Latin pop singer)
Jon Secada
Bachata Magic
Alejandro Fernández
Banda Vallarta Show
Rey Ruiz
Caña Brava
Olga Tañón
Zona Roja

Number-ones albums and singles by country 
List of number-one albums of 1992 (Spain)
List of number-one singles of 1992 (Spain)
List of number-one Billboard Top Latin Albums of 1992
List of number-one Billboard Hot Latin Tracks of 1992

Awards 
1992 Premio Lo Nuestro
1992 Tejano Music Awards

Albums released

First quarter

January

February

March

Second quarter

April

May

June

Third quarter

July

August

September

Fourth quarter

October

November

December

Unknown date

Best-selling records

Best-selling albums
The following is a list of the top 5 best-selling Latin albums of 1992 in the United States in the categories of Latin pop, Regional Mexican, and Tropical/salsa, according to Billboard.

Best-performing songs
The following is a list of the top 10 best-performing Latin songs in the United States in 1992, according to Billboard.

Births 
February 26 – Danilo Mesquita, Brazilian actor, singer and composer
March 13Ozuna, Puerto Rican reggaeton and trap singer
July 8 – Ariel Camacho, Founder and lead singer of Los Plebes del Rancho de Ariel Camacho (d. 2015)
July 10Nego do Borel, Brazilian funk ostentação singer
July 27 – El Dasa, Mexican banda singer
August 19Feid Colombian urbano singer
September 16Guaynaa, Puerto Rican reggaeton singer
September 25Rosalía, Spanish pop singer
October 30Greeicy, Colombian singer
November 26Anuel AA, Puerto Rican trap artist

Deaths 
February 5 – Nicomedes Santa Cruz, Afro-Peruvian musician
March 18 – Antonio Molina, Spanish flamenco singer
May 16 - Chalino Sanchez, Mexican corrido singer
May 23 – Atahualpa Yupanqui, Argentine trova singer
May 31 – Iosu Expósito, Spanish rock musician
June 11 – Rafael Orozco Maestre, Colombian vallenato singer
July 2 – Camarón de la Isla, Spanish flamenco singer
July 4 – Ástor Piazzolla, Argentine tango composer
October 9 – Juanma Suárez, Spanish rock singer
November 27 – Daniel Santos, Puerto Rican bolero singer

References 

 
Latin music by year